Luis Fernando Bonilla Ramírez (born 19 September 1997) is a Colombian footballer who currently plays as a midfielder for Saltillo F.C., on loan from UANL.

Career statistics

Club

Notes

References

1997 births
Living people
Colombian footballers
Colombian expatriate footballers
Association football midfielders
Categoría Primera A players
Liga Premier de México players
Tigres UANL footballers
Patriotas Boyacá footballers
Expatriate footballers in Mexico
Colombian expatriate sportspeople in Mexico
Sportspeople from Cauca Department
21st-century Colombian people